Muhammad Radikal Idealis (born July 1, 1991) is an Indonesian footballer who currently plays for Persatu Tuban in the Liga 2.

References

External links

1991 births
Association football defenders
Living people
Indonesian footballers
Liga 1 (Indonesia) players
Indonesian Premier Division players
PSIM Yogyakarta players
Persela Lamongan players
21st-century Indonesian people